Gwane is a town in Bas-Uele Province in the Democratic Republic of the Congo (DRC).

Populated places in Bas-Uélé